The Granat Encyclopedic Dictionary is a Russian encyclopedic dictionary originally published in 58 volumes with one supplement throughout both the Tsarist and Soviet periods. The dictionary's full title is The Encyclopedic Dictionary of the Granat Russian Bibliographical Institute (Russian: Энциклопедический словарь Русского библиографического института Гранат). The word "Granat" refers to the last name of two brothers, Alexander (1861 - 1933) and Ignatiy Granat (1863 - 1941), who commissioned the articles in their Moscow office (Ignatiy Granat was later executed by shooting).  

First appearing in 1910, the dictionary was finally completed in 1948. The first 33 volumes were published in 1910–17 and the remaining volumes from 1922 onwards. The dictionary's large size allowed each entry sufficient space to present relatively full information. Among the dictionary's contributors and editors were Vladimir Lenin, who wrote on Karl Marx, botanist Kliment Timiryazev, anthropologist Dmitry Anuchin, biologist Ilya Mechnikov and economist Alexander Konyus. Unlike the Brockhaus and Efron Encyclopedic Dictionary, the Granat Encyclopedic Dictionary was written primarily by Russian authors.

References

External links
Online Russian version

Book series introduced in 1910
Russian dictionaries
Russian-language encyclopedias
20th-century encyclopedias